This was the first edition of the women's event.

Qualifier Anzhelika Isaeva won her first pro title, defeating top seed Greet Minnen after the latter retired in the final after the first set.

Seeds

Draw

Finals

Top half

Bottom half

References

Main Draw

Nur-Sultan International Tournament - Singles